À prendre ou à laisser (Take it or leave it) is the French version of the television game show Deal or No Deal. It was premiered on 12 January 2004 on TF1. It is hosted by Arthur, the former vice-president of Endemol-France and a popular radio presenter.

There are 22 boxes representing the 22 régions of France, with each contestant coming from that region. The prizes range from €0.01 to €500,000 and include (normally) three "joke" prizes (e.g. a cup or a coat hanger) and a "joker", containing an amount determined by the number of contestants who answer the "selection-question" correctly. The "joker" is €10,000 (sometimes €30,000) multiplied by the number of correct answers.

There has been at least seven winners of the €500,000 prize. On 17 July 2004, Pascal Olmeta accepted the offer of €620,000 after eliminating all the boxes except for the €1,000,000 box and a box which contains the CD. He had the latter in his box. It is always considered as "l'affaire du siècle" (deal of the century).

Other factors particular to the French version are that the prize is shared with a viewer who has phoned in to enter the competition and that offers of an "échange" (change of box) are fairly frequent.

In 2006, the graphics were changed to be more similar to the American version. The top prize was raised to €1,000,000, and the number of boxes was raised to 24. The number of French regions stated on the opening titles was also 24, two more people representing an overseas department (départements d'outre-mer) and an ex-pat. Alongside revised graphics, the set was also heavily revamped.

After being cancelled in late 2006, it was re-commissioned on 5 January 2009 and the prize was lowered back to €500,000, with a new graphics and music being similar to the United States syndicated version and the set being similar to the UK version. It now has a 45-minute slot at 6:30 pm (French hour) every weekday. The show still has 24 boxes, keeping some of the larger prize boxes. Since its comeback, A prendre ou à laisser has had only one €500,000 winner. On 23 January 2009, Marie-Ange had a €500,000 box and she refused all banker's offers (until €210,000).

The last season of the show on TF1 started on 12 April 2010 and ended on 3 June 2010.

Boards

12 to 24 January 2004 
*: may be replaced by joke prizes

27 January 2004 to 9 July 2004

Summer 2004 (Primetime Specials)

3 January to 23 December 2005

2 January to 2 June 2006

4 September to 22 December 2006

5 January to 24 April 2009

12 April to 3 June 2010 

From 2005 to 2006, there was one Joker box. Its value depended on correct answers: if a contestant answered correctly, €10,000 was added into the Joker box. In this case, if all 22 contestants gave the correct answers, the Joker box was worth €220,000. On some occasions, each correct answer was worth €30,000, that could result in a €660,000 box. On 2 June 2006, a correct answer was worth €50,000, which could boost the value of the Joker box to €1,100,000. But, in this show there were only 4 correct answers, so the Joker box, at the time, was worth €200,000.

Revival
A revival of the show was premièred on 8 October 2014 on D8. It is hosted by Julien Courbet. The first season ended on 5 December 2014. The second season started on 31 August 2015 and ended on 30 October 2015.

Board

The jackpot prize starts at €1,000 and increases by €500 for each time it is not won as a bonus by opening the box containing it within the first three picks. In 2014, it could also be won if it is in the contestant's box and it is not sold. In 2015, if it is not found in the first three picks, it is replaced with an object prize.

Since 31 August 2020, the top prize is replaced by another jackpot, which starts at €250,000 and increases by €5,000 for each time it is not won.

At the end of each game, the contestant is asked if he or she wishes to buy the 25th box (25ème boîte) for the amount already won on the show (except for the jackpot).

In 2014, the box contains one of three cards:
€0: The contestant wins nothing.
=: The contestant's winnings remain unchanged.
×2: The contestant's winnings are doubled.

In 2015, the "=" is replaced with two new possibilities:
÷2: The contestant's winnings are halved.
+€1000: €1,000 is added to the contestant's winnings.

The banker also proposes a 3rd type of offer: the comeback, where the contestant can return into the game after accepting a money offer.

Seasons

External links
Official website (D8)

French game shows
2004 French television series debuts